The 2002–03 Liga Bet season saw Hapoel Makr, Hapoel Reineh, F.C. Kafr Qasim and Beitar Giv'at Ze'ev win their regional divisions and promoted to Liga Alef.

At the bottom, Maccabi Bnei Yarka, Hapoel Kisra (from North A division), Hapoel Nahliel (from North B division), Shimshon Bnei Tayibe (from South A division), Hapoel Rahat and Hapoel Sde Uzziah (from South B division) were all automatically relegated to Liga Gimel.

North A Division

North B Division

South A Division

South B Division

References
Liga Bet North, 02-03 one.co.il 
Liga Bet North B, 02-03 one.co.il 
Liga Bet South A, 02-03  one.co.il 
Liga Bet South B, 02-03 one.co.il

External links
 The Israel Football Association
 The Israel Football Association
 The Israel Football Association
 The Israel Football Association

Liga Bet seasons
5
Israel